Igor Sergeyevich Telkov (born 6 May 1989) is a Russian former professional football player.

Club career
He made his Russian Football National League debut for FC Salyut Belgorod on 28 August 2013 in a game against FC Luch-Energiya Vladivostok.

External links
 
 

1989 births
People from Novomoskovsky District
Living people
Russian footballers
Association football goalkeepers
FC Khimik-Arsenal players
FC Salyut Belgorod players
FC Tyumen players
FC Saturn Ramenskoye players
Sportspeople from Tula Oblast